Ross O. Doyen (October 1, 1926 – July 3, 2014) was an American rancher, farmer, and politician.

Born near Rice, Kansas, Doyan served in the United States Navy during World War II. Doyen received his bachelor's degree in agricultural engineering from Kansas State University in 190. He was a farmer and rancher. He served in the Kansas House of Representatives, as a Republican from 1959 to 1968 and then in the Kansas State Senate from 1969 to 1992 and served as chairman of the Ways and Means Committee and president of the senate. Additionally, he served with the National Conference of State Legislatures and Conference of State Governments. He died in Concordia, Kansas.

Notes

1926 births
2014 deaths
People from Cloud County, Kansas
Military personnel from Kansas
Kansas State University alumni
Presidents of the Kansas Senate
Republican Party Kansas state senators
Republican Party members of the Kansas House of Representatives
Ranchers from Kansas
Farmers from Kansas
United States Navy personnel of World War II
20th-century American politicians